Neven Madi (born 25 November 1992) is an Emirati-Syrian actress. She is best known for her work in television series broadcast in the Persian Gulf region, as well as in some Syrian works. She began her career in 1999 as a child. Her most famous roles were in Sea Shadow in 2011, Eyes ink in 2012, Love is bossy in 2014, Justice: Qalb Al Adala in 2017, and The Inheritance in 2020. She is the cousin of Syrian actress Jumana Murad.

Works

Series

Films

Stages

References

External links
 Neven Madi on IMDb

1992 births
Living people
People from Abu Dhabi
Emirati people of Syrian descent
Emirati film actresses
Syrian film actresses
Syrian television actresses
Syrian stage actresses